Diego García Corrales (October 12, 1961 – March 31, 2001) was a long-distance athlete from Spain, who finished in 9th position (2:14.56) in the men's marathon at the 1992 Summer Olympics in Barcelona, Spain. Four years later, when Atlanta, United States hosted the Games, he ended up in 53rd place, clocking 2:22:11. He was born in Azkoitia, Gipuzkoa and died in Azpeitia.

Achievements

References
  Spanish Olympic Committee
  sports-reference

1961 births
2001 deaths
Spanish male long-distance runners
Olympic athletes of Spain
Athletes (track and field) at the 1992 Summer Olympics
Athletes (track and field) at the 1996 Summer Olympics
European Athletics Championships medalists